Swen Gillberg is an American visual effects artist, best known for his work with Digital Domain. He was nominated for an Academy Award in the category Best Visual Effects for the films Real Steel and Free Guy.

Selected filmography 
 Real Steel (2011; co-nominated with Erik Nash, John Rosengrant and Danny Gordon Taylor)
 Free Guy (2021; co-nominated with Bryan Grill, Nikos Kalaitzidis and Dan Sudick)

References

External links 

Living people
Year of birth missing (living people)
Place of birth missing (living people)
Visual effects artists
Visual effects supervisors